Greatest Hits 1970–1978 is a compilation album from Black Sabbath, released in 2006.

This album features only the original line-up of Black Sabbath with all the albums Ozzy Osbourne worked on presented from 1970's self-titled debut album to 1978's Never Say Die!.

The album debuted on the Billboard 200 album chart on 1 April 2006 at number 96. It spent 10 weeks on the chart.

It was released to coincide with the band's induction into the American Rock and Roll Hall of Fame.

Track listing
All songs written by Black Sabbath (Tony Iommi, Ozzy Osbourne, Geezer Butler, and Bill Ward).

Personnel
Black Sabbath
Ozzy Osbourne - vocals
Tony Iommi - guitar
Geezer Butler - bass
Bill Ward - drums

Production
Sharon Osbourne – executive production
Rodger Bain, Patrick Meehan, Mike Butcher – production
Dan Hersch, Bill Inglot – remastering

Release history

See also

References 

2006 greatest hits albums
Albums produced by Rodger Bain
Black Sabbath compilation albums
Rhino Records compilation albums
Warner Records compilation albums